Scott Ramsay may refer to:

 Scott Ramsay (tenor), American operatic tenor
 Scott Ramsay (footballer) (born 1980), English footballer
Scott Ramsay (curler) in 2012 DEKALB Superspiel

See also
Scott Ramsey (disambiguation)